William Richard Ratchford (May 24, 1934 – January 2, 2011) was an American politician from Connecticut. He served six terms in the Connecticut House of Representatives, including two as speaker, and three terms in the United States House of Representatives. He was a member of the Democratic Party.

Early life 
He was born in Danbury, Connecticut. In 1952, Ratchford graduated from Danbury High School in Danbury, Connecticut. In 1956, he received a B.A. from the University of Connecticut, Storrs, where he was a member of the Chi Phi Fraternity. In 1959, he graduated with his J.D. from Georgetown Law School, Washington, D.C. He served in the Connecticut National Guard from 1959 to 1965. Ratchford was admitted to the Connecticut bar in 1959 and commenced practice in Danbury, in 1960.

Political career
He was elected to the Connecticut House of Representatives in 1962. In 1969, he became the  speaker a post that he held until 1972. In 1974, he ran for Congress from the 5th congressional district, but lost to Ronald A. Sarasin.

After his defeat, he served as chairman of the Governor's Blue Ribbon Committee on Nursing Homes from 1975 to 1976, and as Commissioner on Aging from 1977 to 1978. He served as a delegate to the Connecticut State Democratic conventions from 1960 to 1974, and as a delegate to the Democratic National Conventions in 1972 and 1984.

Congress 
In 1978, he made a second run for Congress for the seat that Sarasin vacated to run for Governor. He defeated State Senator George Guidera by 8,273 votes. He won re-election in 1980 and 1982. In 1984, he was defeated by future Connecticut Governor John G. Rowland as Ronald Reagan’s landslide re-election boosted Republicans.

Congress 
After leaving Congress, he taught at his alma mater, Georgetown University, and worked as a lobbyist. He later was the Associate Administrator in the Office of Congressional and Intergovernmental Affairs at the U.S. General Services Administration from 1993 to 2001.

Death
He died on January 2, 2011, aged 76, from complications of Parkinson's disease. He had been a long-time resident of Arlington, Virginia.

References

External links

 

1934 births
2011 deaths
Politicians from Danbury, Connecticut
University of Connecticut alumni
Georgetown University Law Center alumni
Democratic Party members of the Connecticut House of Representatives
People from Arlington County, Virginia
Speakers of the Connecticut House of Representatives
Neurological disease deaths in Virginia
Deaths from Parkinson's disease
Democratic Party members of the United States House of Representatives from Connecticut
20th-century American politicians
Danbury High School alumni
Members of Congress who became lobbyists